CACI International Inc. (originally California Analysis Center, Inc., then Consolidated Analysis Center, Inc.) is an American multinational professional services and information technology company headquartered in Northern Virginia. CACI provides services to many branches of the US federal government including defense, homeland security, intelligence, and healthcare.

CACI has approximately 23,000 employees worldwide.

CACI is a member of the Fortune 1000 Largest Companies, the Russell 2000 index, and the S&P MidCap 400 Index.

History
CACI was founded by Herb Karr and Harry Markowitz, who left RAND Corporation in 1962 to commercialize the SIMSCRIPT simulation programming language. The company went public in 1968. "CACI", which was originally an acronym for "California Analysis Center, Incorporated", was changed to stand for "Consolidated Analysis Center, Incorporated" in 1967. In 1973, the acronym alone was adopted as the firm's official name; reflecting the name customers had grown familiar 
with.

Their CACI Limited (UK) subsidiary was founded in 1975.

In February 2020, CACI announced the hiring of former White House staffer Daniel Walsh as corporate strategic adviser and senior vice president.

In April 2022, CACI announced that it had been awarded the Gold Edison Award, for its critical data dark web analysis intelligence platform DarkBlue.

Acquisitions

Internal growth
CACI's SIMSCRIPT software product line added object-oriented capability, and added a new government contracting area: Space.

Controversies

Abu Ghraib 
On June 9, 2004, a group of 256 Iraqis sued CACI International and Titan Corporation (now L-3 Services, part of L-3 Communications) in U.S. federal court regarding CACI's alleged involvement in the Abu Ghraib prison matter.

Details are still, in 2019, under review by authorities.

A 2017 story in The Washington Post reported that "a group of former Iraqi detainees got to make the case before a judge ... that they were tortured and that the contractor CACI International is partly to blame."

Competitors
Depending on the focus (USA, International), competitors to CACI include Accenture, Capgemini, Infosys, Leidos, and Booz Allen Hamilton.

See also
Top 100 US Federal Contractors

References

External links
 CACI Corporate Official web site

1962 establishments in Virginia
Abu Ghraib torture and prisoner abuse
American companies established in 1962
Business intelligence companies
Business services companies established in 1962
Companies based in Reston, Virginia
Companies listed on the New York Stock Exchange
Computer companies established in 1962
Consulting firms established in 1962
Defense companies of the United States
Information technology consulting firms of the United States